A graser or gamma-ray laser is a hypothetical device that would produce coherent gamma rays.

Graser may also refer to:
 Gräser or Graser, a surname
 a gravity laser
 Graser Nunatak, Palmer Land, Antarctica

See also
 Gaser (disambiguation)
 Grasser